Abdoulie Kenny Mansally (born 27 January 1989) is a Gambian footballer. He is featured on the Gambian national team in the official 2010 FIFA World Cup video game.

Professional career

New England Revolution
Mansally began his career in The Gambia, graduating from the youth academy of Real de Banjul, and playing in the GFA League First Division.

He was scouted by New England Revolution head coach Steve Nicol while playing in the 2007 FIFA U-20 World Cup, and signed with the Revolution shortly thereafter along with his Gambian teammate, Sainey Nyassi. He made his first start for the Revolution on 29 March 2008, and scored his first MLS goal on 9 April 2008 in a game against the Kansas City Wizards.

On 3 April 2010, he had his first career multi-goal game, a brace (including his first league goal in over a year) with a pair of goals 110 seconds apart to spark New England to a 2–0 victory.

Mansally was waived by New England on 4 May 2012.

Real Salt Lake
After trials with both D.C. United and Real Salt Lake, Mansally officially signed with Salt Lake on 20 June 2012.
He made his debut for the club on 4 July 2012 in a 0-0 tie against Seattle Sounders FC.

Houston Dynamo
Mansally was traded to Houston Dynamo ahead of the 2016 season in exchange for a third-round pick in the 2017 MLS SuperDraft.

FC Inter Turku
After signing for FC Inter Turku in February 2018, he left the club again at the end of the year.

International career
Mansally received his first call-up for the Gambia National Football Team during qualifying for the 2010 World Cup, and was an unused substitute in the home and away matches against Liberia. He earned his first cap for his country coming off the bench in a qualifier against Algeria.

Personal

Mansally went by the nickname "Kenny" for years, including for his first six seasons as a professional in MLS before dropping the nickname at the outset of the 2013 season in order to remind people of who he is and where he came from.

Mansally received his U.S. green card in 2010 which qualifies him as a domestic player for MLS roster purposes.

Mansally received his US citizenship in 2015.

Charity Work
Mansally started the Mansally Foundation based on improving the lives and the conditions of the community where he grew up. The country of Gambia is a small country in Africa where most families farm for a living. The foundation is in place to provide children from Gambia access to food, medical care, and an education to a brighter future.

https://web.archive.org/web/20150222050125/http://www.mansallyfoundation.org/

Honors

New England Revolution
Lamar Hunt U.S. Open Cup (1): 2007
North American SuperLiga (1): 2008

Real Salt Lake
Major League Soccer Western Conference Championship (1): 2013

Individual
MLS Player Of The Week: Week 2, 2010

References

External links
 
 
 

1989 births
Living people
Gambian footballers
Gambian expatriate footballers
The Gambia international footballers
The Gambia youth international footballers
Real de Banjul FC players
New England Revolution players
Real Salt Lake players
Houston Dynamo FC players
Rio Grande Valley FC Toros players
Association football midfielders
People from Banjul
Expatriate soccer players in the United States
Major League Soccer players
USL Championship players
FC Inter Turku players
Veikkausliiga players
Charlotte Independence players